Danny DeVito is an American actor and filmmaker, who has been active in film since the 1970s. One of his early notable roles was as Martini in One Flew Over the Cuckoo's Nest in 1975 alongside Jack Nicholson. In the 70s and 80s, he appeared in Car Wash (1976), Terms of Endearment (1983), Romancing the Stone (1984) and its sequel The Jewel of the Nile (1985), Ruthless People (1986), Throw Momma from the Train (1987), Twins (1988), and The War of the Roses (1989). In 1992, he was cast in the role of the villain Penguin opposite Michael Keaton's Batman in Batman Returns. In the 90's, he starred in Renaissance Man (1994), and co-starred in the films Get Shorty with Gene Hackman (1995), Matilda with wife Rhea Perlman, which he also directed and produced. He played George Shapiro in 1999's Man on the Moon opposite Jim Carrey, who played Andy Kaufman, a real-life friend of DeVito's. 

He appeared in his third movie with Bette Midler in 2000's Drowning Mona (2000), and his fourth movie with John Travolta in 2005's Be Cool. He added his voice to the 2012 film The Lorax, and co-starred with Keaton again in Dumbo as Max Medici (2019). He appeared in the sequel film Jumanji: The Next Level (2019).

DeVito played the role of Louie De Palma in the television series Taxi from 1978 to 1983, airing in 114 episodes. That role earned him a Golden Globe Award for Best Supporting Actor – Series, Miniseries or Television Film (1979) and a Primetime Emmy Award for Outstanding Supporting Actor in a Comedy Series (1980). He guest starred in several television series over the years such as Starsky and Hutch (1977), Friends (2004) and The Simpsons (1991, 1992, 2013). He has starred in the television series It's Always Sunny in Philadelphia as Frank Reynolds since 2006.

He and wife Rhea Perlman founded the production company Jersey Films in 1992, which have produced such films as Pulp Fiction (1994), Gattaca (1997), Erin Brockovich (2000), and Garden State (2004).

As actor

Film

Television

Video games

Theatre

Music videos

As director and producer

References

External links
 

American filmographies
Director filmographies
Male actor filmographies